Muntanya de Santa Bàrbara  is a mountain that is part of the northwestern foothills of the Ports de Tortosa-Beseit, Catalonia, Spain.

The Sant Salvador d'Horta monastery, also known as Convent dels Àngels, is located at the foot of this mountain.

This mountain is one of the Emblematic summits of Catalonia.

See also
Ports de Tortosa-Beseit
Mountains of Catalonia
Iberian System

References

External links
Horta de Sant Joan Tourist Office

Ports de Tortosa-Beseit
Mountains of Catalonia
Terra Alta (comarca)
Emblematic summits of Catalonia